Two Sides: The Very Best of Mike Oldfield is a compilation album by British multi-instrumentalist Mike Oldfield that was released on 30 July 2012 by Mercury Records.

Background and release 
The content of the album was compiled by Oldfield himself. The album cover features two depictions of Oldfield's signature Tubular Bells logo, one in bright pink and the other in dark blue, on a blue night's sky background. It was released on the same day as a number of other Oldfield releases; QE2 and Platinum remasters, and a 6 CD boxed set.

The release came days after Oldfield's performance at the 2012 Summer Olympics opening ceremony. The exact version of Tubular Bells that Oldfield performed at the opening ceremony is not on this album, but is available on Isles of Wonder: Music for the Opening Ceremony of the London 2012 Olympic Games.

Additionally in August 2012 Universal and Indaba Music created a Tubular Bells remix contest, where users could download original stem recordings to create their own pieces. The winner of the $1000 prize was judged by Oldfield.

Charts 
The album charted at 6 in the UK Albums Chart on 5 August 2012.

Track listing
All songs written by Mike Oldfield, except where noted.

Disc one

Disc two

References

External links 
 

Mike Oldfield compilation albums
2012 compilation albums
Mercury Records compilation albums